Posavski Podgajci is a village in eastern Croatia located west of Drenovci, near the border with Bosnia and Herzegovina. The population is 1,255 (census 2011).

Name
The name of the village in Croatian is plural.

See also
Vukovar-Syrmia County
Cvelferija

References

Populated places in Vukovar-Syrmia County
Populated places in Syrmia